Eric M. Smith (born January 22, 1980) is an American murderer who, at the age of thirteen, tortured and murdered a four-year-old child, Derrick Joseph Robie (October 2, 1988 – August 2, 1993), in Steuben County, New York, on August 2, 1993. Smith was convicted of second-degree murder in 1994 and sentenced to the maximum term then available for juvenile murderers: nine years to life in prison. Smith was granted parole in October 2021, after 27 years in prison. He was officially released in February 2022.

Murder

On August 2, 1993, when Smith was thirteen years old, he was riding his bike to summer camp in a local park day camp. Four-year-old Derrick Robie was walking alone to that same camp. Smith saw Robie and lured him into a nearby wooded area. There, Smith strangled him, dropped a large rock on his head, and raped him with a small stick. Smith took Kool-Aid from Robie's lunch box and poured it into Robie's open wounds. The cause of death was determined to be blunt trauma to the head with contributing asphyxia. At around 11:00 a.m., Robie's mother, Doreen, went to the park to pick up her son, only to find that Robie had never arrived. After four hours of investigation, Robie's body was found.

The murder case made national headlines, largely due to the age of the killer (13) and of the victim (4). On August 8, 1993, Smith confessed to his mother that he killed Derrick. The Smith family informed law enforcement later that night. 

Smith was subjected to extensive medical testing from specialists on both sides. They examined brain function, hormone levels and found nothing to explain his violent behavior. According to court documents, Smith was a loner who was often tormented by bullies for his protruding low-set ears, thick glasses, red hair and freckles.

A defense psychiatrist testified to diagnosing Smith with intermittent explosive disorder, a mental condition that causes violent and unpredictable behavior. However, the prosecution's expert said the disorder was rarely seen at Smith's age.

Conviction and incarceration
On August 16, 1994, Smith was convicted of second-degree murder and sentenced to the maximum term then available for juvenile murderers: a minimum of nine years to life in prison. While in jail, Smith read out an apology letter to Robie's family on public television:

At the end of this statement, Smith states that he cannot bear the thought of "walls, razor wire, and steel metal bars" for the rest of his life. He has also apologized to Derrick Robie in interviews.

Smith was held in a juvenile facility for three years and was then transferred to an open prison for young adults. In 2001, he was transferred to the Clinton Correctional Facility in Dannemora, New York, a maximum security prison. As of May 3, 2016, the NYS Department of Corrections website showed him incarcerated at Collins Correctional Facility, a medium security prison for male inmates in Erie County, New York. On April 26, 2019, he was listed as incarcerated at Gowanda Correctional Facility, a medium security prison which is co-located with Collins Correctional Facility. On November 30, 2019, he was listed as incarcerated at the Woodbourne Correctional Facility in Sullivan County.

Smith was denied parole ten times from 2002 to January 2020. After the 2012 hearing, the parole board cited a concern for public safety in its decision, in addition to the opposition of Robie's parents to his release. At that hearing, he told a parole board he would not return to Savona if released, and would go to a shelter or halfway house instead.

In October 2021, Smith was granted parole after 27 years of incarceration. He was scheduled to be released on November 17, 2021, but this  was delayed due to Smith not having an approved residence. He was ultimately released from prison on February 1, 2022.

See also
 Craig Price (murderer)
 Murder of James Bulger
 Mary Bell
 Melinda Loveless 
 Josh Phillips (murderer)
 Parker–Hulme murder case
Murder of Ana Kriégel

References

External links
What Childhood is Meant to Be from The Malefactor's Register

Eric Smith parole interview, April 9, 2014

1980 births
1993 murders in the United States
20th-century American criminals
American male criminals

American rapists
Crime in New York (state)
Criminals from New York (state)
Incidents of violence against boys
Living people
Male murderers
Minors convicted of murder
People convicted of murder by New York (state)
People from Steuben County, New York
Violence against children
Violence against men in North America